Khadamat-e Aetla'at-e Dawlati (Pashto/ literally "State Intelligence Agency", also known as "State Information Services" or "Committee of State Security". Usually referred to by the acronym KHAD, it was the main security agency and intelligence agency of Afghanistan. It functioned as the secret police when Afghanistan was occupied by the Soviet Union during the Soviet–Afghan War.

History

Pre-KHAD
Afghanistan had an intelligence agency known as the Istikhbarat or Intelligence. However, observers have stated it was incompetent with Afghan leaders since it was ineffective as they preferred to use their personal connections instead.

After the events of the Saur Revolution, the PDPA established AGSA (Da Afghanistan da Gato da Saatane Adara or Afghan Agency for Safeguarding National Interest) as its domestic/foreign intelligence agency with Assadullah Sarwari serving as its first director. Sarwari was known for torturing anyone who disagreed with the PDPA. AGSA operations eventually led to an anti-PDPA insurgency.

In September 1979, AGSA was replaced with KAM (Komite-ye Amniyat-e Melli or National Security Committee) under Hafizullah Amin's direction. Several AGSA officials were either placed under surveillance or were arrested.

Aziz Ahmed Akbari was called in to take over from Sarwari when he took refuge in the Soviet Embassy. After two months, Assadullah Amin was appointed by his uncle to lead KAM. KAM did not last long after the Soviets officially entered Afghanistan in 1979.

KHAD establishment
KHAD was created with 1,200 personnel who took over intelligence responsibilities from KAM in December 1979 with most of them being pro-Parchams. It was initially headed by Mohammad Najibullah, alongside Dr.Baha. After Soviet troops were deployed in Afghanistan, KHAD was expanded with Moscow's assistance, which includes sophisticated torture equipment. Najibullah took the opportunity of his post to rise within the PDPA before Major-General Ghulam 
Faruq Yaqubi took over KHAD duties in November 1985.

Soviet advisors were known to work alongside KHAD personnel and major decisions are not made without their input. In some instances, KHAD agents accompanied KGB Kaskad (Cascade) operators on anti-mujahideen infiltration ops.

The agency's manpower increased from 1,200 to 25,000 or 30,000 personnel.

KHAD was able to turn some mujahideen groups to work with the PDPA by providing incentives such as small arms or money in return for their loyalty by attending loya jirgas and other pro-PDPA activities. They've worked with the KGB to fund and assist Murtaza Bhutto for his involvement in the hijacking of Pakistan International Airlines Flight 326 and with Baluchistan and Sind dissidents, according to files obtained by Vasili Mitrokhin from KGB files. KHAD's infiltration of various mujahideen groups did help to contribute to some of the infighting.

Post-KHAD
On 9 January 1986, KHAD was changed with its name to WAD (Wazarat-e Amaniat-e Dowlati or Ministry of State Security). It was reported that WAD was placed in charge of controlling the Kabul Garrison. Its budget and size were expanded.

In March 1990, Lieutenant-General Shahnawaz Tanai attempted a coup, which was suppressed by WAD-led forces.

During the civil war in the 1990s, the Northern Alliance recruited ex-KHAD officers and agents to act as their moles operating behind Taliban territory. The Taliban also had ex-KHAD officers and agents among their informants.

Recruitment
Potential KHAD recruits have to be known PDPA members.

Training
Kaskad operators were responsible for training KHAD personnel. Others were trained at the KGB School at Balashikha, Uzbekistan.

Structure

KHAD
KHAD was known to have the following organizational structures in place:

Headquarters
 Directorate of Administration and Finance 
 Directorate of Cadre / Personnel 
 Directorate of Interrogation 
 Directorate of Intelligence and Afghan Diplomatic Missions Abroad 
 Directorate of Post and Parcels 
 Directorate for Operative Activities for Internal Control of KhAD Personnel 
 Directorate for Economy and Anti Corruption 
 Directorate for Counter Rebellion: Two Sub-Directorates covering 16 provinces each. Known to have three military battalions based in Kabul to assist with arrests and other investigative work.
 Directorate for Surveillance of Foreign and National Suspects
 Directorate of the Press and Educational Institutions
 Directorate for the Protection of the Government and its Representatives 
 Directorate of Propaganda and Counter-Propaganda 
 Directorate of Telecommunications and Decoding 
 Directorate for Activities Linked to Infiltration of Mujaheddin 
 Directorate of Logistics 
 Directorate for Agents and Informers 
 Directorate of Analysis and Reporting 
 Military KhAD: Embedded in the Ministry of Defense to prevent infiltration by mujahideen groups.
 Police KhAD: Embedded in the Ministry of Interior to prevent infiltration by mujahideen groups.

Provincial
 
 Administration and Finance 
 Cadre / Personnel Directorate 
 Surveillance of foreign and national suspects 
 Interrogation 
 Post and Parcels 
 Operative activities for internal control of KhAD personnel 
 Propaganda and counter-propaganda 
 Economy and Anti-Corruption 
 Press and Educational institutions 
 Logistics 
 Counter-Rebellion: 2 Sub-Directorates covering 16 Provinces each
 Protection of the government and its representatives 
 Telecommunication and Decoding 
 Activities linked to infiltration of Mujaheddin 
 Agents and Informer Unit 
 Analysis and Reporting 
 City District Offices 
 Rural District Offices
 Military and Police KhAD within the respective ministries' structures

While not part of the KHAD structure, Mufreza militias, recruited from tribal and anti-government militias who agreed to work with them, are finally supported by the agency.

WAD
The WAD was known to have the following organizational structures in place:

 Directorate-General for Security: Ensure WAD's internal/external security.
 Directorate-General for Military Security: Successor of Military KHAD forces.
 Directorate-General for the Interior: Successor of Civilian KHAD activities on monitoring anti-government activities in and out of Afghanistan.

Human rights abuses
KHAD was also accused of human rights abuses in the mid-1980s. These included the use of torture, the use of predetermined "show trials" to dispose of political prisoners, and widespread arbitrary arrest and detention. Secret trials and the execution of prisoners without trial were also common.

It was especially active and aggressive in the urban centers, especially in Kabul. Organizations such as Amnesty International continued to publish detailed reports of KHAD's use of torture and of inhumane conditions in the country's prisons and jails.

KHAD also operated eight detention centers in the capital, which were located at KHAD headquarters, at the Ministry of the Interior headquarters, and at a location known as the Central Interrogation Office. The most notorious of the Communist-run detention centers was Pul-e-Charkhi prison, where 27,000 political prisoners are thought to have been murdered. Recently mass graves of executed prisoners have been uncovered dating back to the Soviet era.

On 29 February 2000, when The Netherlands had no diplomatic mission in Afghanistan, the Dutch Ministry of Foreign Affairs published a disputed report on the involvement of the KHAD on human rights abuses, partly based on secret sources, allegedly biased political sycophants from the side of the Taliban and the Pakistani intelligence agency ISI. Some of its conclusions were already published in the Dutch press before the official publication of the full report. This report, quoted frequently in the cases of Afghan asylum seekers to support the exclusion ground of article 1F of the Convention Relating to the Status of Refugees in the national refugee policy of the Netherlands, was also published in an English translation on 26 April 2001. In 2008, another report on this matter was published by the UNHCR. In this report, some conclusions of the Dutch report were contested.

On 14 October 2005, the District Court in the Hague convicted two high-ranking KhAD officers who sought asylum in the Netherlands in the 1990s. Hesamuddin Hesam and Habibullah Jalalzoy were found guilty of complicity to torture and violations of the laws and customs of war, committed in Afghanistan in the 1980s. Hesam was sentenced to 12 years imprisonment. He was the head of the military intelligence service (KhAD-e-Nezamy) and deputy minister of the Ministry of State Security (WAD). Jalalzoy was the head of the unit investigations and interrogations within the military intelligence of the KhAD. He was sentenced to 9 years imprisonment.

On 29 January 2007, the Dutch appeal court upheld the sentences. The judgements were confirmed by the Dutch Supreme Court on 10 July 2008.

On 25 June 2007, the District Court in the Hague acquitted another senior KhAD officer. General Abdullah Faqirzada was one of the deputy heads of the KhAD-e-Nezamy from 1980 until 1987. Although the court held it plausible that Faqirzada was closely involved with the human rights abuses in the military branch of the KhAD, it concluded there was no evidence for his individual involvement nor his command responsibility for the specific crimes the charge was based upon. On 16 July 2009, the Dutch appeal court upheld the acquittal.

Directors of KHAD and its predecessors

Legacy
The National Directorate of Security is treated as the successor of KHAD.

Notes

References

Bibliography
 
 

Defunct Afghan intelligence agencies
Collaborators with the Soviet Union
Secret police
Afghanistan–Soviet Union relations